Mount Skokomish is a 6,434 ft (1,961 meter) mountain summit located in the Olympic Mountains, in Mason County of Washington state. It is situated on the shared boundary of Olympic National Park with Mount Skokomish Wilderness, and is the highest point of the wilderness. Its nearest higher peak is Mount Stone,  to the northeast. It is visible on the Olympic skyline from as far away as Seattle. Mt. Skokomish has three summits, the south peak being the highest. Precipitation runoff drains into the Hamma Hamma River and Skokomish River. Like the river, the mountain's name honors the Skokomish people.

Climate
Mount Skokomish is located in the marine west coast climate zone of western North America. Most weather fronts originate in the Pacific Ocean, and travel northeast toward the Olympic Mountains. As fronts approach, they are forced upward by the peaks of the Olympic Range, causing them to drop their moisture in the form of rain or snowfall (Orographic lift). As a result, the Olympics experience high precipitation, especially during the winter months. During winter months, weather is usually cloudy, but, due to high pressure systems over the Pacific Ocean that intensify during summer months, there is often little or no cloud cover during the summer. Because of maritime influence, snow tends to be wet and heavy, resulting in avalanche danger.

Geology

The Olympic Mountains are composed of obducted clastic wedge material and oceanic crust, primarily Eocene sandstone, turbidite, and basaltic oceanic crust. The mountains were sculpted during the Pleistocene era by erosion and glaciers advancing and retreating multiple times.

Gallery

See also

 Mount Skokomish Wilderness
 Olympic Mountains

References

External links
 Mount Skokomish Wilderness U.S. Forest Service
 
 Mount Skokomish weather: Mountain Forecast

Olympic Mountains
Landforms of Mason County, Washington
Mountains of Washington (state)
North American 1000 m summits
Olympic National Park